is a railway station in the city of  Morioka, Iwate Prefecture Japan, jointly operated by East Japan Railway Company (JR East) and the operated by the third sector Iwate Ginga Railway Company.

Lines
Kōma Station is a terminal station on the JR East Hanawa Line, and is located 106.9 rail kilometers from the opposing terminus of the line at Ōdate Station in Akita Prefecture. However, most trains continue on to Morioka Station. It is also a station on the Iwate Ginga Railway Line, and is located 21.3 rail kilometers from the terminus of the line at Morioka Station.

Station layout
Kōma Station is an elevated station with a single side platform and single island platform connected by footbridges, serving three tracks.

Platforms

History
Kōma Station opened on September 1, 1891, serving the village of Tamayama, Iwate. A new station building was completed in May 2011.

Passenger statistics
In fiscal 2015, the station was used by an average of 1,973 passengers daily.

Surrounding area
National Route 4
 Kōma Post Office
Kitakami River

See also
 List of Railway Stations in Japan

References

External links

 Iwate Ginga Railway Station information 
 JR East Station information 

Railway stations in Iwate Prefecture
Iwate Galaxy Railway Line
Hanawa Line
Stations of East Japan Railway Company
Railway stations in Japan opened in 1891
Morioka, Iwate